The 2017 season was the Baltimore Ravens' 22nd in the National Football League (NFL) and their 10th under head coach John Harbaugh. This was also the 10th season with Joe Flacco as the team's starting quarterback. The Ravens improved on the previous season's 8–8 record, but failed to qualify for the playoffs for the third consecutive season because of a last second touchdown in a 31–27 loss to the Cincinnati Bengals, combined with a Buffalo Bills' victory over the Miami Dolphins in Week 17.

Offseason

Signings

Releases

Draft

Notes
 The Ravens traded their third-round selection (No. 99) and defensive tackle Timmy Jernigan to the Philadelphia Eagles in exchange for the Eagles' third-round selection (No. 74).
 The Ravens traded their sixth-round selection (No. 198) and center Jeremy Zuttah to the San Francisco 49ers in exchange for the 49ers' sixth-round selection (No. 186).
 The Ravens traded their seventh-round selection (No. 234) to the Los Angeles Rams during the  season in exchange for wide receiver Chris Givens.

Staff

Final roster

Accolades
 Tyus Bowser – Pepsi Rookie of the Week, Week 2
 Matthew Judon – AFC Defensive Player of the Week, week 11
 Sam Koch – AFC Special Teams Player of the Week, week 12
 Justin Tucker – AFC Special Teams Player of the Month, November
 Eric Weddle – AFC Defensive Player of the Week, week 13
 Sam Koch – AFC Special Teams Player of the Week, week 15

Pro Bowlers
 C. J. Mosley
 Terrell Suggs
 Eric Weddle

All-Pros
 Justin Tucker – Second team
 C. J. Mosley – Second team

Preseason

Regular season

Schedule

Note: Intra-division opponents are in bold text.

Game summaries

Week 1: Baltimore Ravens 20, Cincinnati Bengals 0

Week 2: Baltimore Ravens 24, Cleveland Browns 10

Week 3: Jacksonville Jaguars 44, Baltimore Ravens 7
NFL London Games

Week 4: Pittsburgh Steelers 26, Baltimore Ravens 9

Week 5: Baltimore Ravens 30, Oakland Raiders 17

After several weeks of dismal offensive plays, the Ravens traveled west to Oakland having lost two straight to the Raiders. But the offense was able to power through behind a very strong defensive performance, albeit with Raiders' starting quarterback Derek Carr injured.

Week 6: Chicago Bears 27, Baltimore Ravens 24 (OT)

Week 7: Minnesota Vikings 24, Baltimore Ravens 16

Week 8: Baltimore Ravens 40, Miami Dolphins 0

The Ravens put out their largest point total of the season despite a combined 121 passing yards from Joe Flacco and Ryan Mallett.  The Ravens defense forced an end zone fumble and scored twice on interceptions in the fourth quarter.  With the game completely in hand the appearance of a stray cat on the field past the two-minute warning caused some amusement in the CBS Sports television booth.

Week 9: Tennessee Titans 23, Baltimore Ravens 20

This was the seventh straight game in the rivalry between the two clubs in which the winner alternated, a streak that was still active entering 2020.

Week 11: Baltimore Ravens 23, Green Bay Packers 0
 The Ravens came into Lambeau Field having never won a game with a 0–3 record there. However, they forced five turnovers off a Packers offense struggling greatly without injured star quarterback Aaron Rodgers, which proved costly as the Ravens got their third shutout of the season 23–0, their first ever win in Wisconsin.

Week 12: Baltimore Ravens 23, Houston Texans 16

Week 13: Baltimore Ravens 44, Detroit Lions 20

Week 14: Pittsburgh Steelers 39, Baltimore Ravens 38

Week 15: Baltimore Ravens 27, Cleveland Browns 10

Week 16: Baltimore Ravens 23, Indianapolis Colts 16

Week 17: Cincinnati Bengals 31, Baltimore Ravens 27

The Ravens' playoff dreams were dashed in heartbreaking fashion after Eric Weddle's would be game-winning interception was negated by a defensive pass interference call, in which the drive ended with a go-ahead Bengals touchdown. After a 4th down Flacco pass to Wallace that failed to convert into a 1st down, the Ravens turned over the ball and lost to the Bengals. This loss would be significant because in addition to eliminating them from the playoffs, it allowed the Buffalo Bills to make the playoffs for the first time since the 1999 season.

Standings

Division

Conference

References

External links
 

Baltimore
Baltimore Ravens seasons
2017 in sports in Maryland
2010s in Baltimore